Gorenja Vas–Reteče ( or ;) is a village on the left bank of the Sora River in the Municipality of Škofja Loka in the Upper Carniola region of Slovenia.

Name
The name of the settlement was changed from Gorenja vas to Gorenja vas-Reteče in 1953. In the past the German name was Goreinawas.

References

External links 

Gorenja Vas–Reteče at Geopedia

Populated places in the Municipality of Škofja Loka